Niederrieden is a municipality in the district of Unterallgäu in Bavaria, Germany. The town has a municipal association with Boos.

References

Unterallgäu